Guy P. Wyser-Pratte (born June 21, 1940 in Vichy, France) is an American financial investor and corporate raider. He joined the Marine Corps at age 18 before eventually moving into finance.  He is the head of New York-based Wyser-Pratte & Co., an investment fund with some $500 million in assets under management founded in 1991, focused on "undervalued European equities."

Wyser-Pratte holds an M.B.A. in finance from New York University and a B.A. in history from the University of Rochester. He wrote two books on risk arbitrage (1971 and 1982).

In 2010, Wyser-Pratte tried to take control of Lagardere but he failed because of the opposition of the majority of shareholders.

References

Further reading

People from Vichy
1940 births
Living people
French emigrants to the United States
University of Rochester alumni
New York University Stern School of Business alumni
Corporate raiders